Ivan Ivanovych Kulichenko (born on 7 July 1955, Dnipropetrovsk, Ukrainian SSR, USSR) is a Ukrainian politician who was from 2014 until 2019 People's Deputy of Ukraine; prior to this he was Mayor of Dnipropetrovsk for 15 years.

Biography
In 1977 Kulichenko graduated from the Dnipropetrovsk Institute of Civil Engineering. In 1979, after his conscription in the Armed Forces of the USSR, he became a civil servant in the urban planning department of the Dnipropetrovsk Oblast. In 1986 Kulichenko was appointed Deputy Chairman of the Planning Commission of the Dnipropetrovsk City Council. Four years later he was appointed Deputy Chairman of the Executive Committee of Dnipropetrovsk. Kulichenko became the First Deputy Mayor of Dnipropetrovsk (city) in 1994. In 1999 Kulichenko became acting Mayor of Dnipropetrovsk. Since then he was (re-)elected Mayor four times, in 2000, in 2002, in 2006 and in 2010. In 2010 he was re-elected with 40,1% as a candidate of Party of Regions. His nearest opponent, Svyatoslav Oliynyk of Ukraine of the Future, received 16.1%. On 22 February 2014 Kulichenko left Party of Regions "for peace in the city". Earlier that day locals, while picketing the city council, had demanded his departure of Party of Regions. 22 February 2014 was also the day that Ukrainian President Viktor Yanukovych and the Party of Region's lead Second Azarov Government were ousted out of office, after the months long Euromaidan-demonstrations had accumulated into the 2014 Euromaidan regional state administration occupations and deadly violence in Kyiv.

In the 2014 parliamentary election Kulichenko won a constituency seat in constituency number 28 situated in Dnipropetrovsk as a candidate of Petro Poroshenko Bloc with 33.5% of the votes. He resigned as mayor on 21 November 2014.

Kulichenko was not re-elected in the 2019 Ukrainian parliamentary election, as an independent candidate he failed this time to win a seat in constituency number 28. This time 13.49% of the voters of the constituency voted for him.

Notes

References

External links
 Official website

1955 births
Living people
Mayors of Dnipro
Independent politicians in Ukraine
Party of Regions politicians
Petro Poroshenko Bloc politicians
People of the Euromaidan
Pro-Ukrainian people of the 2014 pro-Russian unrest in Ukraine
Eighth convocation members of the Verkhovna Rada
21st-century Ukrainian politicians
Recipients of the Order of Prince Yaroslav the Wise, 4th class